Indira, also known as Indira Billi, is an Indian actress, Born on 6 August 1936  She acted in many Punjabi films as a heroine and played minor roles in many Hindi films. She married Shiv Kumar who is/was also an actor.

Filmography 
Here are her selected films:

Punjabi

  Kiklee (1960)
Yamla Jatt (1960)
Do Lachhian (1960)
 Chambe Di Kali (1960) Chambi
 Billo (1961)
 Khedan De Din Char (1962)
 Lado Rani (1963)
Jagga (1964)
Mama Ji (1964)... as Laali
Sassi Punnu (1965 film)... as Sassi
 Shehar Di Kudi (1966) Neem Hakeem (1967) Pardesan (1969)Dupatta (1970)Kankan De Ohle (1970)  Patola (1973)

Urdu/Hindi
Shri Ganesh Mahima (1950) as  Rukmini 
Rangila (1953)
 Faraar (1955)
Milap (1955)
Shree 420 (1955)
 Jawab (1955)
Basant Bahar (1956)
 Laxmi (1957)... actors in theatre
Paristan (1957)
Yahudi (1958)... as Yasmin
Dil Deke Dekho (1959)
  Lalach (1960)
Lucky Number  (1961)
Asli-Naqli (1962).. as Indira
Do Dil (1965) ..as Radhika
Teen Sardar (1965) ..as Rukhsana
 PROFESSOR AUR JADUGAR (1966)
Ali Baba 40 Chor(1966)
Phool Aur Patthar (1966)
Badrinath Yatra (1967) ..as Chandra 
Mere Huzoor (1968)

References

External links 

Actresses in Punjabi cinema
Indian film actresses
20th-century Indian actresses
Actresses in Hindi cinema
Living people
1936 births